Bad Moon Rising: The Best of Creedence Clearwater Revival is a compilation album of the major hits from American rock band Creedence Clearwater Revival. It was released in 2003.

Track listing
*"Bad Moon Rising" - 2:18
"Up Around the Bend" - 2:42
*"Proud Mary" - 3:07
"Travelin' Band" - 2:07
"Green River" - 2:32
"Down on the Corner" - 2:45
"Have You Ever Seen the Rain?" - 2:38
"Long as I Can See the Light" - 3:31
"Sweet Hitch-Hiker" - 2:56
"Susie Q" - 4:35
"Lodi" - 3:09
"Commotion" - 2:41
"I Put a Spell on You" - 4:30
*"Born on the Bayou" - 5:15
*"Fortunate Son" - 2:18
"Hey Tonight" - 2:42
"Who'll Stop the Rain" - 2:28
"Wrote a Song For Everyone" - 4:55
"Run Through the Jungle" - 3:06
"Lookin' Out My Back Door" - 2:31
"Someday Never Comes" - 4:00
*"I Heard It Through the Grapevine" - 3:52
"The Midnight Special" - 4:10

Best of Creedence Clearwater Revival
"The CCR Mix" is a song only featured on an Asian version of the album and is a song that was performed live and is a medley of several different songs, including "Proud Mary", "Who'll Stop the Rain", and "Lodi".

"Have You Ever Seen the Rain?" - 2:38
"Who'll Stop the Rain" - 2:28
"Cotton Fields" - 2:55
"Proud Mary" - 3:07
"Lodi" - 3:09
"Bad Moon Rising" - 2:18
"Down on the Corner" - 2:44
"Hello Mary Lou" - 2:15
"Hey Tonight" - 2:42
"Someday Never Comes" - 4:00
"Long as I Can See the Light" - 3:31
"Lookin' Out My Back Door" - 2:32
"Susie Q, Pt. 2" - 3:48
"Green River" - 2:32
"Sweet Hitch-Hiker" - 2:56
"Up Around the Bend" - 2:42
"Molina" - 2:41
"Travelin' Band" - 2:07
"The CCR Mix (Proud Mary/Born on the Bayou/Who'll Stop the Rain/Lodi/...)" - 7:08

2008 version
 Bad Moon Rising - 2:22
 Born On The Bayou - 5:16
 Proud Mary - 3:08
 Travelin' Band - 2:10
 Have You Ever Seen the Rain - 2:42
 Green River - 2:33
 Down On The Corner - 2:45
 Lodi - 3:12
 Fortunate Son - 2:20
 Lookin' Out My Back Door - 2:34
 Run Through the Jungle - 3:06
 I Put a Spell On You - 4:32
 Susie Q - 4:37
 Sweet Hitch-Hiker - 2:57
 It Came Out of the Sky - 2:56
 Who'll Stop the Rain - 2:29
 I Heard It Through the Grapevine (Edit) - 3:55
 Hey Tonight - 2:44
 Cotton Fields - 2:58
 Long As I Can See the Light - 3:34
 Molina (Edit) - 2:10
 Hello Mary Lou - 2:15
 The Midnight Special - 4:14
 Up Around the Bend - 2:43

References

2003 greatest hits albums
Creedence Clearwater Revival compilation albums
Fantasy Records compilation albums
Albums produced by John Fogerty
Albums produced by Stu Cook
Albums produced by Doug Clifford
Albums produced by Saul Zaentz